The Jærhøns or Norske Jærhøns is the only indigenous breed of domestic chicken in Norway. It is named for the traditional district of Jæren in the county of Rogaland.

History

The Jærhøns was the principal chicken breed of Norway until imports of foreign breeds began in the nineteenth century. The Jærhøns was selectively bred at the state-controlled breeding station at Bryne in Jæren from its establishment in 1916 until it closed in 1973. Breeding stock was then transferred to the state agricultural college at Hvam, Nes. Following work done in the first half of the twentieth century, the Jærhøns is auto-sexing.

The Jærhøns was listed as a "conservation-worthy national breed" by the Norwegian Forest and Landscape Institute in its 2008–2010 action plan for the conservation and sustainable use of animal genetic resources in Norway.

Characteristics

Two colour varieties are recognised for the Jærhøns, dark brown and yellow, and light brown and yellow. The comb is single, and the beak and legs are bright yellow.

A bantam Jærhøns with the same two colour varieties was approved in 1994.

Use

The Jærhøns lays approximately 215 eggs per year, about 20% less than industrial purpose-bred layers. The eggs are white, and weigh a minimum of

References

Further reading

 T. Twito, S. Weigend, S. Bluma, Z. Granevitzea, M.W. Feldmand, R. Perl-Trevese, U. Lavib, J. Hillela (2007). Biodiversity of 20 chicken breeds assessed by SNPs located in gene regions. Cytogenetic and Genome Research 117: 319–326. 
 Nina Sæther, Anna Rehnberg (2016). Norsk Genressurssenters Handlingsplan for Bevaringsverdige Husdyrraser 2016-2019 (in Norwegian). Norsk institutt for skog og landskap.
Nina Sæther, Alvilde Hovden, Peer Berg, Jessica Kathle, Cathrine Brekke, Linn F. Groeneveld (2018). Strategiplan for Genbanken for verpehøns 2018-2027. NIBIO.
Nina Sæther (2017). Jærhøns (in Norwegian). Norwegian Genetic Resource Centre.
 Cathrine Brekke, Linn F. Groeneveld, T. H. E. Meuwissen, Nina Sæther, S. Weigend, P. Berg. (2020).Assessing the Genetic Diversity Conserved in the Norwegian Live Poultry Genebank. Acta Agriculturae Scandinavica, Section A — Animal Science, February. Taylor & Francis, 1–13. .
 		 	

Chicken breeds
Chicken breeds originating in Norway
